Xiong Jingnan (born January 12, 1988) is a Chinese mixed martial artist. She is the inaugural and reigning ONE Women's Strawweight World Champion. She is also the first ever Chinese World Champion in mixed martial arts history.

Background 
Xiong was born in Weishan County, Jining, Shandong province in 1988. Xiong was initially scouted and selected to the weightlifting program in a sports school. She began her martial arts journey at the age of 18 as a member of the Shandong women's boxing team and represented China internationally.

She was inspired by Chinese martial arts movies from an early age and has always lived by the heroic values she saw on screen. Of particular note, she loved 'The Swordsman.' Besides standing up for the weak and bullied whenever she could, Xiong made many sacrifices to be the best in her field, moving away from home and foregoing many typical teenage activities to focus on training for competition.

After adding BJJ to her arsenal, she won a China Open BJJ championship. She then set her sights on competing in mixed martial arts and threw herself into it completely, training several times a day from morning to night.

Mixed martial arts career

Early career 
Xiong made her professional MMA debut in 2014, fighting exclusively in Kunlun Fight and amassed a record of 10–1 before signing with ONE Championship.

ONE Championship 
Xiong made her promotional debut on December 9, 2017, at ONE Championship: Warriors of the World beating April Osenio.

ONE Women's Strawweight World Champion 
Xiong then faced Tiffany Teo for the inaugural strawweight title on January 20, 2018, at ONE Championship: Kings of Courage. She stopped the Singaporean in the fourth round to win the ONE Women's Strawweight Championship belt. With the win, she became the first Chinese World Champion in mixed martial arts history.

Xiong was scheduled to make her first title defense against Laura Balin at ONE Championship: Battle for the Heavens on May 26, 2018. However, the whole event was cancelled and Xiong went on to successfully defend her title at ONE Championship: Pinnacle of Power on June 23, 2018.

Subsequently, Xiong successfully defended the title against Samara Santos Cunha at ONE Championship: Beyond the Horizon on September 8, 2018.

Xiong was scheduled to defend her title against reigning ONE Championship Atomweight Champion Angela Lee at ONE Championship: Heart of the Lion on November 9, 2018. However, on November 5, 2018, Lee revealed that she was forced off the card due to a back injury. The bout eventually took place at ONE Championship: A New Era, where Xiong became the first fighter to ever beat Lee.

Challenging for the Atomweight title 
Xiong and Lee fought again in a rematch this time for Lee's Atomweight Championship at ONE Championship: Century Part 1 on October 13, 2019. Xiong lost by submission.

Return to Strawweight 
She returned to strawweight to defend her ONE Women's Strawweight Championship at ONE Championship: Inside the Matrix in a rematch of the championship fight that first earned her title against Tiffany Teo. Surviving a late surge from Tiffany, Xiong defended her title, winning the fight via unanimous decision.

Xiong was then scheduled to defend her ONE Women's Strawweight Championship against Michelle Nicolini at ONE Championship: Empower on May 28, 2021. However, the event was postponed to take place on September 3, 2021, due to the COVID-19 pandemic. She won the bout via unanimous decision, avoiding going to the ground with her opponent and winning the striking exchanges.

Xiong defended her title against Ayaka Miura on January 14, 2022, at ONE: Heavy Hitters. She won the bout in dominant fashion via unanimous decision.

Xiong made her seventh strawweight title defense against the ONE Women's Atomweight (115 lbs) champion Angela Lee at ONE on Prime Video 2 on September 30, 2022. She retained her title by unanimous decision.

Gym affiliation 

Xiong formerly represented Alliance China and Bali MMA and is now currently representing Evolve MMA. She does the bulk of her training at Bali MMA.

She previously trained at Phuket Top Team and represented the gym in her ONE debut against April Osenio.

Championships and accomplishments

Mixed martial arts 
 ONE Championship
ONE Women's Strawweight Championship (One time; current).
Seven successful title defenses

Mixed martial arts record 

|-
|Win
|align=center|18–2
|Angela Lee
|Decision (unanimous)
| ONE on Prime Video 2
|
|align=center|5
|align=center|5:00
|Kallang, Singapore
|
|-
| Win
| align=center|17–2
| Ayaka Miura
| Decision (unanimous)
| ONE: Heavy Hitters
| 
| align=center|5
| align=center|5:00
| Kallang, Singapore
| 
|-
| Win
| align=center|16–2
| Michelle Nicolini
| Decision (unanimous)
| ONE Championship: Empower
| 
| align=center|5
| align=center|5:00
| Kallang, Singapore
| 
|-
| Win
| align=center|15–2
| Tiffany Teo
| Decision (unanimous)
| ONE Championship: Inside the Matrix
| 
| align=center|5
| align=center|5:00
| Kallang, Singapore
| 
|-
| Loss
| align=center|14–2
| Angela Lee
| Submission (rear-naked choke)
| ONE Championship: Century Part 1
| 
| align=center|5
| align=center|4:48
| Tokyo, Japan
| 
|-
| Win
| align=center| 14–1
| Angela Lee
| TKO (body kicks and punches)
| ONE Championship: A New Era
|
| align=center| 5
| align=center| 1:37
|Tokyo, Japan
| 
|-
| Win
| align=center| 13–1
| Samara Santos Cunha
| KO (punch)
| ONE Championship: Beyond the Horizon
| 
| align=center| 3
| align=center| 1:22
| Shanghai, China
| 
|-
| Win
| align=center| 12–1
| Laura Balin
| Decision (unanimous)
| ONE Championship: Pinnacle of Power
| 
| align=center| 5
| align=center| 5:00
|Beijing, China
| 
|-
| Win
| align=center| 11–1
| Tiffany Teo
| TKO (punches)
| ONE Championship: Kings of Courage
| 
| align=center| 4
| align=center| 2:17
| Jakarta, Indonesia
| 
|-
| Win
| align=center| 10–1
| April Osenio
| TKO (punches)
| ONE Championship: Warriors of the World
| 
| align=center| 1
| align=center| 3:44
| Bangkok, Thailand
|
|-
| Win
| align=center| 9–1
| Alena Gondášová
| KO (head kick)
| Kunlun Fight MMA 7
| 
| align=center| 2
| align=center| 4:13
| Beijing, China
|
|-
| Win
| align=center| 8–1
| Julia Borisova
| Decision (unanimous)
| Kunlun Fight 51
| 
| align=center| 3
| align=center| 5:00
| Fuzhou, China
|
|-
| Win
| align=center| 7–1
| Mona Samir
| TKO (punches)
| Kunlun Fight 48
| 
| align=center| 1
| align=center| 4:00
| Jining, China
|
|-
| Win
| align=center| 6–1
| Daria Chibisova
| Decision (unanimous)
| Kunlun Fight 30
| 
| align=center| 3
| align=center| 5:00
| Dazhou, China
|
|-
| Loss
| align=center| 5–1
| Colleen Schneider
| Decision (unanimous)
| Kunlun Fight 26
| 
| align=center| 3
| align=center| 5:00
| Chongqing, China
|
|-
| Win
| align=center| 5-0
| Victoria Godumchuk 
| TKO (punches)
| Kunlun Fight 23
| 
| align=center| 1
| align=center| 1:43
| Changsha, China
|
|-
| Win
| align=center| 4–0
| Marina Lvova
| TKO (punches)
| Kunlun Fight 22
| 
| align=center| 1
| align=center| 1:52
| Changde, China
| 
|-
| Win
| align=center| 3–0
| Liliya Kazak
| Decision (unanimous)
| Kunlun Fight 19
| 
| align=center| 3
| align=center| 1:22
| Guangzhou, China
| 
|-
| Win
| align=center| 2–0
| Liubov Tiupina
| TKO (punches)
| Kunlun Fight 15
| 
| align=center| 1
| align=center| 2:19
| Nanjing, China
| 
|-
| Win
| align=center| 1–0
| Inna Hutsal 
| Submission (armbar)
| Kunlun Fight 9
| 
| align=center| 1
| align=center| 0:50
| Shangqiu, China
| 
|-

See also 
 List of female mixed martial artists

References

External links 
 Xiong Jing Nan at ONE
 

1988 births
Living people
Chinese female mixed martial artists
Chinese sanshou practitioners
Chinese practitioners of Brazilian jiu-jitsu
Female Brazilian jiu-jitsu practitioners
Chinese female kickboxers
Mixed martial artists utilizing sanshou
Mixed martial artists utilizing boxing
Mixed martial artists utilizing Brazilian jiu-jitsu
Strawweight mixed martial artists
Kunlun Fight MMA Fighters
Sportspeople from Shandong
People from Jining
ONE Championship champions